Nasmyth, Gaskell and Company, originally called The Bridgewater Foundry, specialised in the production of heavy machine tools and locomotives.  It was located in Patricroft, in Salford England, close to the Liverpool and Manchester Railway, the Bridgewater Canal and the Manchester Ship Canal. The company was founded in 1836 and dissolved in 1940.

Nasmyth
The company was founded in 1836 by James Nasmyth and Holbrook Gaskell. Nasmyth had previously been employed in Henry Maudslay's workshop in Lambeth and his interest was mainly, but not limited to, specialist machine tools.

Modern materials handling
The Bridgewater Foundry is an example of modern materials handling that was part of the evolution of the assembly line.

The buildings were arranged in a line with a railway for carrying the work going through the buildings.  Cranes were used for lifting the heavy work, which sometimes weighed in the tens of tons.  The work passed sequentially through to the erection of the framework and final assembly.

Locomotives
The company produced nine locomotives in 1839, thirteen in 1840, eight in 1841 and sixteen in 1842. These were sub-contracted from other makers such as Edward Bury, and produced to their designs. Those for the Midland Counties and London and Southampton Railways were 2-2-0 with  driving wheels and  cylinders, similar to those railway's Bury machines. In 1841 the Birmingham and Gloucester Railway had found some American Norris 4-2-0 locomotives very successful, especially on the notorious Lickey Incline, and the company built six similar ones for the line.

Expansion
In 1850 the name of the firm was changed to James Nasmyth and Company, then in 1857 to Patricroft Ironworks. In 1867 Robert Wilson and Henry Garnett became the principal partners and the company's name changed again to Nasmyth, Wilson and Company.

From about 1873 the demand for locomotives from overseas increased. By 1938 over  locomotives had been produced, over one thousand of which were exported.

In 1883, Nasmyth Wilson and Co. produced the very first design of Prairie or 2-6-2 locomotives in the world, for the New Zealand Railways Department. These locomotives entered traffic between 1885 and 1890 after a somewhat rough start. several were dumped in rivers as flood protection in the 1920s, and have since been exhumed for preservation.

Decline and closure

During World War I the factory was mainly engaged in munitions work, but it built twenty 2-8-0 locomotives for the French Chemin de fer de l'État (140-251 to 140-270) and 32 for India, along with a hundred small petrol driven locomotives.

Sales continued after the end of the war but by the early 1930s orders had begun to dwindle. In 1934 the works supplied four standard gauge N class 0-6-0T shunters to Palestine Railways. These were evidently satisfactory as Palestine Railways bought four more in 1935, two in 1936 and a final pair in 1938.

The last locomotive order was for two 2-6-4T metre gauge tank locomotives, Works No. 1649 and 1650, dispatched in 1938 to the South Indian Railways. Only two other locomotives were produced in 1938; these were the last pair of N class 0-6-0Ts for Palestine Railways, Works No. 1651 and 1652. 

As part of a planned reorganisation of the industry, the company ceased manufacture of locomotives and handed over all its drawings and patterns to the British Locomotive Manufacturers Association. The company continued to make steam hammers and machine tools.

On 1 June 1940 the Ministry of Supply took over the factory and it became an engineering Royal Ordnance Factory, ROF Patricroft. The company, however, was formally wound up on 7 November 1940, having reported a loss of £2,663 for 1939.

In 1987, the Royal Ordnance Factories were bought by British Aerospace and in 1989 the Patricroft engineering works was closed down. The site, including some of the original buildings, is now used as a business and technology centre.

By 2009, a large section (the central building) had been demolished.

Locomotive production list

References

Bibliography

Further reading 

Machine tool builders
Locomotive manufacturers of the United Kingdom
Manufacturing companies established in 1836
Manufacturing companies disestablished in 1940
Defunct manufacturing companies of the United Kingdom
Companies based in Salford
1836 establishments in England
1940 disestablishments in England